Westhampton Beach High School is a public four-year high school for grades 9–12 in Westhampton Beach, New York, which is located at the southeastern end of Suffolk County on Long Island.

Notable alumni
Rick Rasmussen, surfer; attended until age 15
John Hart Ely, legal scholar and Dean of Stanford Law School
Dan Jiggetts, retired American football offensive linesman (Class of 1972)
Sean Farrell, retired American Football guard (Class of 1976)
Christian Nilsson, filmmaker best known for Dashcam (2021) and Unsubscribe (2020) which topped the U.S. box office in June 2020 (Class of 2006)

References

External links
Westhampton Beach High School website
Hurricanes Football website
Hurricane FRC Robotics Team website

Public high schools in New York (state)
Schools in Suffolk County, New York